Jonathan Epstein is an economist who worked on the implementation and establishment of Australia's sovereign wealth fund, the Future Fund as a senior analyst and adviser to the chairman.

He helped with the creation and establishment of the International Forum of Sovereign Wealth Funds (IFSWF), worked for Australia's longest serving Federal Treasurer. He now works for ECG Advisory Solutions a specialist financial advisory consultancy which specialises in the intersection of business, government and the financial markets. He is a board member of the non-profit body dedicated to finding a cure for Crohn and Colitis disease.

References

Year of birth missing (living people)
Living people
Australian economists